This is a list of Japanese erotic video games, also known in Japan as eroge. This list does not include fan created parodies. The market in Japan for this type of game is quite large, and only a small number of the games gain any level of recognition beyond the fans of the genre.

0–9 

5 (video game)
11eyes: Tsumi to Batsu to Aganai no Shōjo
21: Two One

A 

After...
Air
Aiyoku no Eustia
Akaneiro ni Somaru Saka
Akane Maniax
Akiba Girls
Alpha
Angel
Angels in the Court
Ayakashi

B 

Baldr Force
Baldr Sky
Battle Raper series
Battle Raper
Battle Raper 2
Beat Angel Escalayer
Bible Black
Bittersweet Fools

C 

Cafe Little Wish
Campus (anime)
Canary (video game)
Canvas2
Cat Girl Alliance (Koneko Doumei)
Caucasus: Nanatsuki no Nie
Cherry Petals Fall Like Teardrops
Clear (video game)
Clover Heart's
Cobra Mission: Panic in Cobra City
Comic Party
Cosmos no Sora ni
Crescendo (video game)
Criminal Girls: Invite Only
Cross Channel
Cross Days

D 

Da Capo
Da Capo II
December When There Is No Angel
Demonbane
The Devil on G-String
Divi-Dead
Djibril – The Devil Angel
Do You Like Horny Bunnies?
Dohna Dohna
Dōkyūsei series by ELF
Dōkyūsei (Classmates)
Dōkyūsei 2
Dōsei (Cohabitation)
Dracu-riot!
Dracula Hakushaku
Dragon Knight series
Dragon Knight
Dragon Knight II
Dragon Knight III (Knights of Xentar)
Dragon Knight 4
Dramatical Murder

E 

Eden*
Ef: A Fairy Tale of the Two
Él
Enzai: Falsely Accused
Eternal Fantasy
EVE Burst Error

F 

FairChild
FairlyLife
Fate/stay night by Type-Moon
Fate/hollow ataraxia
Flyable Heart
Fortune Arterial
The Fruit of Grisaia
Full Metal Daemon: Muramasa
Furifuri

G 

Gaku Ou: The Royal Seven Stars
Gals Panic series
Gekkō no Carnevale
Gift
Girl Next Door
Go Go Burunyanman
A Good Librarian Like a Good Shepherd
Green Green
The Guts! series

H 

H2O: Footprints in the Sand 
Happiness! (video game)
Haru no Ashioto
Harukoi Otome
Hatsuyuki Sakura
Heart de Roommate
Hello, Good-bye
Honey Select
HoneyComing
Hoshiuta
Hoshizora e Kakaru Hashi
Hoshizora no Memoria

I 

 The Idol Janshi Suchie-Pai series
 If My Heart Had Wings
Imouto Paradise!
Imouto Paradise 2
In Search of the Lost Future
Iro ni Ide ni Keri Waga Koi wa
Itaike na Kanojo

J 

Jingai Makyō

K 

Kagetsu Tohya
Kamikaze Explorer!
Kana: Little Sister
Kango Shicyauzo
Kanojo × Kanojo × Kanojo
Kanon
Kara no Shojo
Kaze no Uta
Kikokugai
Kimi ga Nozomu Eien
Kimi no Nagori wa Shizuka ni Yurete
Kindred Spirits on the Roof
Kira Kira
A Kiss for the Petals
Kizuato
Knights of Xentar (Dragon Knight III)
Koihime Musō
Kono Aozora ni Yakusoku wo
Kud Wafter
Kurenai no Tsuki
Kusari

L 

Lady Sword
Lamune
Lightning Warrior Raidy
Lightning Warrior Raidy II:~Temple Of Desire~
Little Busters!
Lolita Syndrome
Love, Election and Chocolate

M 

Magic Woman M (Magical Girl Meruru)
Magical Canan
Mahjong Sisters
Maitetsu
Maji de Watashi ni Koi Shinasai! (Majikoi!)
Maji Suki: Marginal Skip
Maple Colors
Mashiroiro Symphony
Mizuiro
Moekan
Moon
Moonlight Lady
Muv-Luv
My Girlfriend Is the President

N 

Naka no Hito nado Inai! Tokyo Hero Project
Nanatsuiro Drops
Nee Pon? × Rai Pon!
 The Nekopara seriesNight LifeNight Shift NursesNight SlaveNightwalker: The Midnight DetectiveNo, Thank You!!!Nocturnal IllusionNora, Princess, and Stray CatNorth Wind (video game)Nostradamus ni Kiite MiroNursery Rhyme O One: Kagayaku Kisetsu eOrange PocketOtome wa Boku ni Koishiteru (Otoboku)

 P Peace@PiecesPhantom of InfernoPipi & Bibi'sPoibos Part 1PopotanPrincess HolidayPrincess Lover!Prism HeartPrism ArkPrism RhythmPuzznic R R.U.R.U.R. The Rance series by AliceSoftRapelayReally? Really!Ren'ai CHU!Root After and AnotherRui wa Tomo o YobuRumbling Hearts S Saishū Shiken KujiraSakura no UtaSakura SakuraSakura StrasseSanararaSaya no UtaSchool DaysSummer DaysCross DaysShiny Summer DaysSeason of the SakuraSekai to Sekai no Mannaka deSexfriendSharin no Kuni: The Girl Among the SunflowersShikkoku no Sharnoth: What a Beautiful TomorrowShizukuShuffle!Shuffle! Love RainbowShukufuku no CampanellaSnowSnow SakuraSora no Iro, Mizu no Iro (SoraMizu)Sora o Tobu, Mittsu no Hōhō.Soul LinkStellar TheaterSteam-Heart'sStepmother's SinThe Story of Little MonicaSuika_Summer (video game)Suzunone Seven! T Tayutama: Kiss on my DeityTears to TiaraTea Society of a WitchTenshin Ranman: Lucky or Unlucky!?Tenshitachi no GogoThree Sisters' StoryTick! Tack!Time LeapTogainu no ChiTo HeartTo Heart 2Tōka GettanTomoyo After: It's a Wonderful LifeTōshin ToshiTournament of the GodsTriangle HeartTrue LoveTsuki wa Higashi ni Hi wa Nishi ni: Operation Sanctuary (Hanihani)TsukihimeTsuyokissTwinkle Crusaders U Utawarerumono V Valkyrie Complex The Vanilla Series Variable Geo VR Kanojo W W.L.O. Sekai Renai KikōWagamama High SpecWalkure RomanzeWanko to KurasouWe Without Wings The Welcome to Pia Carrot seriesWhite AlbumWhite Album 2Wind: A Breath of HeartWonderful EverydayWords Worth Y Yami to Bōshi to Hon no TabibitoYorite Konoha wa Kurenai niYosuga no SoraYume Miru Kusuri: A Drug That Makes You DreamYU-NO: A Girl Who Chants Love at the Bound of this World Z Zettai Fukuju Meirei''

See also 
 Bishōjo
 Bishōjo game
 List of erotic video games
 List of hentai authors
 List of video games based on anime or manga
 Visual novel

References

External links 
 The Visual Novel Database
 Sutorippu
 uvlist.net
 Computer & Videogame Erotic Games Database @ theoldcomputer.com

 
Erotic Japanese
Erotic video games
Erotica video games